is one of 24 wards of Osaka, Japan. As of October 1, 2006, the ward has an estimated population of 72,742 and the total area is 9.43 km². Taisho is surrounded by canals and it is named after the Taisho bridge, a main bridge built in Taishō period. One fourth of residents has their roots in Okinawa Prefecture, and there are many stores associated with Okinawan culture and Okinawan cuisine in Taisho.

Transport 
 on the Osaka Loop Line railway and the Nagahori Tsurumi-ryokuchi Line subway is located at the northern tip of the ward. The rest of the ward is served by the bus lines operated by Osaka City Bus. As the ward is surrounded by rivers with few bridges for pedestrians, the city provides ferry services.

Train Stations 
West Japan Railway Company (JR West)
Osaka Loop Line

Osaka Metro
Nagahori Tsurumi-ryokuchi Line
Taishō Station

Road 
Hanshin Expressway: Route 17 Nishi-Osaka Line
Japan National Route 43
Onami Street
Taishō Street
Kaigan Street

Education 
Public elementary and junior high schools are operated by the Osaka City Board of Education.

Elementary schools 
Sangenyanishi Elementary School (三軒家西小学校)
Izuohigashi Elementary School (泉尾東小学校)
Nakaizuo Elementary School (中泉尾小学校)
Kitaokajima Elementary School (北恩加島小学校)
Minamiokajima Elementary School (南恩加島小学校)
Tsurumachi Elementary School (鶴町小学校)
Izuokita Elementary School (泉尾北小学校)
Hirao Elementary School (平尾小学校)
Sangenyahigashi Elementary School (三軒家東小学校)
Kobayashi Elementary School (小林小学校)
Tsuruhama Elementary School (鶴浜小学校)

Junior high schools 
Taishōhigashi Junior High School (大正東中学校)
Taishōchūō Junior High School (大正中央中学校)
Taishōnishi Junior High School (大正西中学校)
Taishōkita Junior High School (大正北中学校)

High schools 
Osaka Municipal Izuo Technology High School (大阪市立泉尾工業高等学校) 
Osaka Prefectural Izuo High School (大阪府立泉尾高等学校)
Osaka Prefectural Taisho High School (大阪府立大正高等学校)

Vocational schools 
Osaka Animal Plants Ocean College (大阪動植物海洋専門学校)
Japan MotorSports College (日本モータースポーツ専門学校)

Facilities

Libraries 
Osaka Municipal Taisho Library (大阪市立大正図書館)

Parks 
Mount Shōwa (Chishima Park) (昭和山 (千島公園))

Sports venues 
Azalea Taishō (アゼリア大正): The venue has a hall.
Marine Tennis Park Kitamura (マリンテニスパーク・北村)

Hospitals 
Taishō Hospital (大正病院)
Pref Osaka Saiseikai Izuo Hospital (大阪府済生会泉尾病院)

Department Store 
Chishima Garden Mall (千島ガーデンモール), shopping mall
IKEA store (Tsuruhama)

References

External links 

Official website of Taishō 

Wards of Osaka